Sharon Tobin (born 11 October 1979) is an Irish journalist and newsreader working for Raidió Teilifís Éireann. She is a newsreader mainly presenting the RTÉ News: Six One and RTÉ News: One O'Clock.

In September 2022, Tobin was named as one of four presenters to host Monday Night Live, a new eight-part current affairs panel series on RTÉ One, beginning on 3 October.

Personal life
Tobin married music industry worker Paul Dunne in 2008. They have two children, a son and daughter. The couple split in 2017.

References

1979 births
Living people
Irish women journalists
Irish women radio presenters
RTÉ newsreaders and journalists